The Journal of Singularities is a peer-reviewed open-access scientific journal which publishes research in the area of singularity theory. It was established in 2010 by David B. Massey, who remains editor-in-chief , and is published by the Worldwide Center of Mathematics.

Abstracting and indexing
The journal is indexed and abstracted in:
Emerging Sources Citation Index
MathSciNet
Scopus
zbMATH

References

External links

Mathematics journals
Publications established in 2010
English-language journals
Open access journals